Miyo (written:  or ) is a feminine Japanese given name. Notable people with the name include:

, Japanese actress
, Japanese hurdler
, Japanese football manager 
, Japanese professional boxer 

Miyō or Miyou is a separate given name, though it may be romanized the same way. Notable people with the name include:

, Japanese handball player

Fictional characters
, a character in the manga series Kakegurui – Compulsive Gambler
, a character in the light novel series Tokyo Ravens
, a character in the anime series HappinessCharge PreCure!
, a character in the sound novel Higurashi no Naku Koro ni

Japanese feminine given names